Jenkins Township is a township in Mitchell County, Iowa, USA.

History
Jenkins Township was established in 1857. It is named for Col. James Doran Jenkins, registrar of the U.S. Land office at Osage at that time.

References

Townships in Mitchell County, Iowa
Townships in Iowa
1857 establishments in Iowa
Populated places established in 1857